Guillermo Cañedo de la Bárcena (June 4, 1920 – January 20, 1997) was a Mexican entrepreneur and football manager.  

Cañedo was President of Atlético Zacatepec from 1954 to 1961.

References

Mexican football managers
1920 births
1997 deaths